Veltdalseggi is a mountain in Skjåk Municipality in Innlandet county, Norway. The mountain is surrounded by several other notable mountains including Sponghøi to the east, Høggøymen and Dørkampen to the southeast, Vulueggi to the southwest, Tordsnose to the west, and Karitinden to the north.

See also
List of mountains of Norway

References

Skjåk
Mountains of Innlandet